David Alonzo and Elizabeth Purviance House is a historic home located at Huntington, Huntington County, Indiana.  It was built in 1892, and is a -story, Romanesque Revival / Châteauesque style brick and stone dwelling. It has a modified rectangular plan and is topped by a slate hipped roof.  The house features two corner towers (one rounded and one octagonal), semicircular arches, varied window shapes and sizes, and pressed metal decoration.

It was listed on the National Register of Historic Places in 1994. It is located in the North Jefferson Street Historic District.

References

Houses on the National Register of Historic Places in Indiana
Châteauesque architecture in the United States
Romanesque Revival architecture in Indiana
Houses completed in 1892
Houses in Huntington County, Indiana
National Register of Historic Places in Huntington County, Indiana
Historic district contributing properties in Indiana